Melvin Thom (born July 28, 1938) was born on the Walker River Paiute reservation in Schurz, Nevada. A leader in the movement for Native American civil rights, Thom was one of the founders of the National Indian Youth Council in the 1960s.

Background
Thom graduated from Lyon County High School in Yerington, Nevada and then studied civil engineering at Brigham Young University. At BYU, he was President of the Tribe of Many Feathers Club for three years and also President of the Southwest Regional Indian Youth Council.

References

Native American activists
Northern Paiute people
Brigham Young University alumni
1938 births
Living people
People from Mineral County, Nevada
People from Yerington, Nevada
Activists from Nevada
20th-century Native Americans
21st-century Native Americans